Josef Leppelt (19 March 1900 – November 1950) was an Austrian weightlifter. He competed at the 1924 Summer Olympics and the 1928 Summer Olympics.

References

External links
 

1900 births
1950 deaths
Austrian male weightlifters
Olympic weightlifters of Austria
Weightlifters at the 1924 Summer Olympics
Weightlifters at the 1928 Summer Olympics
Place of birth missing
20th-century Austrian people